Nicholas James Brunelli (born December 18, 1981) is an American freestyle swimmer from Norwood, Massachusetts, who won the gold medal in the men's  medley relay event at the 2003 Pan American Games.
He is also the American Record holder in the 50 freestyle in short course meters format. Brunelli swam collegiately at Arizona State University.

See also 
 Pan American Games records in swimming

References 
 Profile

External links 
 Blog at nickbrunelli.wordpress.com

1981 births
Living people
Swimmers from Massachusetts
Swimmers at the 2003 Pan American Games
People from Norwood, Massachusetts
American male freestyle swimmers
Medalists at the FINA World Swimming Championships (25 m)
Pan American Games gold medalists for the United States
Pan American Games medalists in swimming
Medalists at the 2003 Pan American Games
21st-century American people